The Embassy of the Republic of Indonesia in Bogotá is the diplomatic mission of the Republic of Indonesia to the Republic of Colombia and concurrently accredited to Antigua and Barbuda, Barbados and the Federation of Saint Christopher and Nevis. Diplomatic relations between Indonesia and Colombia were established on 15 September 1980. Initially, the Indonesian embassy in Brasilia, Brazil was accredited to Colombia. This continued until the Indonesian embassy in Bogotá was inaugurated after the arrival of the first Indonesian ambassador to Colombia, Trenggono, on 26 May 1989. The current ambassador is Tatang Budie Utama Razak who was appointed by President Joko Widodo on 25 October 2021.

Galery

See also 
 Indonesia–Colombia relations
 List of diplomatic missions of Indonesia

References 

Bogotá
Indonesia
Buildings and structures in Bogotá